Ahmed Mnajed Abbas (born 13 December 1981) is a former Iraqi footballer. He last played for Sulaymaniya FC in Iraq and the Iraq national football team. He usually played the second striker position.

Biography
Ahmed Menajed was in the Iraq squad in the 2004 AFC Asian Cup, but he featured in only one game, coming on as a substitute against Turkmenistan.  After the tournament, he moved from Al Zawra’a to Bahrain side Rifaa in October 2004. He spent two seasons in Bahrain before joining Lebanon's Al Ansar in August 2006, helping them to win their 13th Lebanon League title this year.
He was brought into the Iraqi national team by Milan Zivadinovic, making his international debut as a half-time substitute in the 0–0 draw with Lebanon on January 31, 2001.

He played for Iraq at the 2004 Summer Olympics in Athens.

Career statistics

International goals
Scores and results list Iraq's goal tally first.

Managerial statistics

Honours

Club
Al-Shorta
Iraqi Elite Cup: 2000, 2001, 2002

Al-Riffa
Bahraini FA Cup: 2004
Bahraini Crown Prince Cup: 2004

Al-Ansar
Lebanese Premier League: 2005–06, 2006–07
Lebanese FA Cup: 2005–06, 2006–07, 2009–10

Duhok
Iraqi Premier League: 2009–10

International
Iraq U20
 AFC Youth Championship: 2000

Iraq U23
 Summer Olympics fourth place: 2004

Iraq
 AFC Asian Cup: 2007

References

1981 births
Expatriate footballers in Lebanon
Iraqi footballers
Footballers at the 2004 Summer Olympics
Olympic footballers of Iraq
Iraqi expatriate footballers
Living people
Al-Zawraa SC players
Al Ansar FC players
Duhok SC players
Lebanese Premier League players
Iraqi expatriate sportspeople in Bahrain
Expatriate footballers in Bahrain
2004 AFC Asian Cup players
2007 AFC Asian Cup players
AFC Asian Cup-winning players
Amanat Baghdad players
Iraqi Sunni Muslims
Al-Shorta SC players
Association football forwards
Iraq international footballers